This is a list of the presidents of the Republic of China.

The Republic of China controlled Mainland China before 1949. In the fall of 1949, the ROC government retreated to Taiwan and surrounding islands as a result of the takeover of the mainland by the Chinese Communist Party and founding of the People's Republic of China. Since 1949, the Republic of China, now commonly known as "Taiwan", has only controlled Taiwan and nearby islands. Martial law ended in Taiwan in the 1980s and direct elections were introduced in 1996.

The official name of the office in Chinese has changed several times.

List 
Provisional Government: 

Beiyang Government: 

Nationalist to Constitutional Government:

Timeline

Presidential age-related data (post-1947 Constitution)

Oldest living 
Green text and an asterisk mark the inauguration date of a president older than any living ex-president. Other dates are the deaths of the then-oldest president.

Graphical lifespan timeline

Gallery

See also 

 List of presidents of the Republic of China by other offices held
 List of vice presidents of the Republic of China
 List of premiers of the Republic of China
 President of the Legislative Yuan
 List of presidents of the Judicial Yuan
 List of presidents of the Control Yuan
 List of presidents of the Examination Yuan
 List of rulers of Taiwan
 List of political office-holders of the Republic of China by age

Notes

External links 
 

Political office-holders in the Republic of China
Political office-holders in the Republic of China on Taiwan
Republic of China
President
President
Lists of leaders of China
Lists of Chinese people